Au delà des rêves is a 2005 album by French-Moroccan R&B singer Amine. It was released in December 2005 and includes the number-one single "J'voulais, in addition to "Ma vie" and "My Girl".

The album reached number 16 on the French SNEP Official Albums Chart. It also charted in Belgian Ultratop Wallonia Albums Chart reaching number 59.

Track listing
"Introduction"
"Ma vie"
"J'voulais"
"My Girl"
"Finiki"
"Si j'avais su que"
"Femmes"
"6ème sens"
"Win"
"Had Lila" (version Arabe)
"Kindir"
"Le Chemin"
"Sobri" (notre destin)(remix club)
"Ma vie" with Big Ali

Charts

References

2005 albums
Amine (French singer) albums